Abrol is a Hindu and Sikh surname based on the name of a Khatri caste. Notable people with the surname include:
Anjali Abrol, Indian actress
 Mohit Abrol (born 1988), Indian television actor
 Zahid Abrol (born 1950), Indian poet

References